Malhostovice is a municipality and village in Brno-Country District in the South Moravian Region of the Czech Republic. It has about 1,000 inhabitants.

Administrative parts

The village of Nuzířov is an administrative part of Malhostovice.

References

Villages in Brno-Country District